Crenigomphus denticulatus is a species of dragonfly in the family Gomphidae. It is endemic to Ethiopia.  It is threatened by habitat loss.

References

Sources

Endemic fauna of Ethiopia
Gomphidae
Insects of Ethiopia
Insects described in 1892
Taxonomy articles created by Polbot